Blair High School may refer to one of the following high schools in the United States:

Montgomery Blair High School in Silver Spring, Maryland
Blair High School (Blair, Nebraska) in Blair, Nebraska
Blair High School (Blair, Oklahoma) in Blair, Oklahoma
Blair-Taylor High School in Blair, Wisconsin
Blair Center Hattiesburg High School in Hattiesburg, Mississippi
Blair Oaks High School, Blair Oaks R-II School District, Jefferson City, Missouri
Blair International Baccalaureate School in Pasadena, California